William Francis Cotton (1847 – 8 June 1917) was an Irish Nationalist politician.  He sat for South Dublin in the United Kingdom House of Commons.

He won the seat at the December 1910 general election, narrowly defeating the Unionist incumbent, and held it until his death.

References

External links
by-election writ following his death
 

Members of the Parliament of the United Kingdom for County Dublin constituencies (1801–1922)
UK MPs 1910–1918
1847 births
1917 deaths